Buddhism offers unique perspectives and insights to the recent emergence of artificial intelligence (AI). Numerous groups and organizations have advised ethical guidelines for artificial intelligence development, endeavouring to make AI systems reflect human ethical and moral values. However, the current contribution towards AI ethical guidelines is unevenly distributed: the majority of them are made by private companies and governmental agencies from more economically developed countries. This causes concerns regarding diversity and inclusion, as existing AI development principles mostly reflect western values. This also highlights the potential to include non-western views, such as Buddhism, in recent AI ethical development.

Context

Intelligent systems 
Intelligence is conventionally defined in terms of goal-achieving, problem-solving, or pattern-recognizing capability. Recent development in machine learning gives rise to systems that can emulate those intelligent behaviours. AlphaGo, a machine learning system developed by DeepMind, became the first computer program that wins Go game against human professional player.

The use of artificial intelligence methods has also become capable of designing novel life forms consisting of both organic tissues and inorganic mechanical parts. Researchers from Tuft University, University of Vermont, and the Wyss Institute constructed the first Xenobots in 2020 from frog cells. These robots can achieve pre-designated goals of spatial orientation, mate recognition, and reproduction of their copies.

These systems demonstrate intelligent behaviour despite their limited goal-achieving capacity at the current early stage of development. Understood as a spectrum, their intelligence behaviour could potentially expand in the future with technological advancement.

Sentient beings 

One major Buddhist goal is to remove suffering for all sentient beings, also known as the Bodhisattva vow. It is then natural to ask what counts as a sentient being and whether AI systems and xenobots are sentient.

This question is different from the following: “Can AI systems and xenobots exhibit undistinguishable intelligent behaviours from humans?” This amended question, which is about intelligent behaviour rather than intelligence per se, has both supportive answers from Alan Turing and the Turing Test, and rejective responses like John Searle’s Chinese Room Argument. Both Turing and Searle’s responses have their limitation in answering the original question: “Can AI systems and xenobots have intelligence and consciousness per se, such that these make them sentient?”To suggest their limitation, Ned Block is concerned about the fundamental restriction of viewing intelligence as functional or computational. The functionalist view of intelligence is either too liberal, in the sense that it regards unintelligent systems as intelligent; or too chauvinist, to the extent that they claim de facto intelligent organisms without relevant hardware parts or organs, such as a brain, as unintelligent. If so, then new life-forms and intelligent systems in the future will then be excluded from the intelligent and sentient category, which will be against the original Buddhist objective to concern all sentient beings if they are actually sentient.

Buddhist principles in AI system design 
For Buddhists, the advancement of artificial intelligence can only be instrumentally good, not good a priori. Then, the main tasks of AI designers and developers are two folds: to set ethical and pragmatic goals for AI systems, and to fulfil the goals with AI in morally permissible manners. Applying Buddhist principles to accomplish these tasks is possible and practical.

General Buddhism-inspired objectives for artificial intelligence 
There are two prima-facie goals for creating artificially intelligent systems. The first goal is to create these systems, in such a way that maximally fulfils our crude sensory desires and worldly instincts of survival, just as we did for designing other tools in general. S. Promta et al. maintains that, it is possible that the majority of AI developers implicitly pursue this goal when they design AI machines, as can be observed by their over-scrutiny of superficial technicalities of these machines, instead of their wider functionalities.  The second goal, on the other hand, is to transcend these desires and  instincts. According to Buddhism, this goal is more worth pursuing than the former one. In Brahmajāla Sutta, the Buddha holds that sensuality, as well as the beliefs and instincts they induce, are what confines beings to suffering.  Expounding his four noble truths (Pali: cattāri ariyasaccāni) in minor Malunkya Sutta, the Buddha also takes eliminating suffering to be the first priority of human life.  The Buddhists then conclude that we can not only reduce, but also eliminate all suffering by transcending and overcoming our instincts of survival, and S. Promta et al. see the potential of how artificial intelligence can help us achieving this.

The Bodhisattva vow and artificial intelligence 
Concerns towards conventional definitions of intelligence as mentioned above reveal potentials to redefine intelligence in novel and radical ways. For instance, inspired by the Bodhisattva vow, T. Doctor et al. proposed the slogan ''intelligence as care'' to try revising the current convention of defining intelligence.  It then follows that, one proposal for improving the current AI system design is to use Bodhisattva vow as a guiding principle for setting AI design goals. Generally, Bodhisattva vow has four components; upon taking the vow, one makes a strong commitment (Pali: Adhiṭṭhāna) to achieve the following: 

 to liberate all beings (from suffering), which are boundless; 
 to extirpate all suffering, which are countless; 
 to be established in all techniques of practicing Dharma (Pali: dhammakkhandha,  Sanskrit: dharmaskandha), which are endless; 
 to experience the ultimate and highest enlightenment (Sanskrit: अनुत्तर सम्यक् सम्बोधि, Romanized: anuttara-samyak-saṃbodhi).  

In essence, T. Doctor et al. defined the Bodhisattva vow as a formal commitment to exercise infinite Care, to alleviate all stress, suffering, or Duḥkha, for all sentient beings: "for the sake of all sentient life, I shall achieve awakening."

From the nonviolence principle of Buddhism, artificial intelligence should not be used to cause harm.

Notable Buddhism-inspired AI instantiations 
While exploring the possibilities of realizing spiritual figures digitally, P. Pataranutaporn et al. implemented a chatbot, named ''Buddha bot'', as an AI embodiment of the Buddha. It allows users to ask it questions and have conversations with it. It uses machine learning concepts to process languages and give responses.

In 2017, Japanese manufacturer Softbank Robotics created a semi-humanoid robotic Buddhist priest, named ''Pepper''. Notable for its capability of discerning human emotions and recognizing facial expressions, it mainly provides funeral services and preaches Buddhist teachings to people.

References 

Buddhism
Religion and technology
Philosophy of artificial intelligence